T. indicus may refer to:
 Tapirus indicus, the Malayan tapir, a mammal species
 Tarsiger indicus, the white-browed bush-robin, a bird species
 Titanosaurus indicus, a dinosaur species
Trachurus indicus, the Arabian scad, a species of jack mackerel

Synonyms 
 Thymus indicus, a synonym for Platostoma menthoides, a species of mint plant
 Tortrix eryx indicus, a synonym for Eryx johnii, a non-venomous snake species found in Iran, Pakistan, and India
Trichophorus inducus, a synonym for Acritillas indica, the golden-browed bulbul
Trionyx indicus, a synonym for Chitra indica, the Indian narrow-headed softshell turtle
Trochus indicus, a synonym for Onustus indicus, a species of large carrier shell

See also
 Indicus (disambiguation)
 Tamarindus indica, a tree species